Rezaabad-e Reza Veys (also Romanized as Reẕāābād-e Reẕā Veys; also known as Reẕā Veys) is a village in Mirbag-e Jonubi Rural District, in the Central District of Delfan County, Lorestan Province, Iran. At the 2006 census, its population was 180, in 39 families.

References 

Towns and villages in Delfan County